Ulrike Jurk (born 4 March 1979) is a German volleyball player.

Career
She participated at the 2002 FIVB World Grand Prix.

Clubs

References

External links
http://www.cev.lu/Competition-Area/PlayerDetails.aspx?TeamID=5638&PlayerID=16568&ID=102

1979 births
Living people
German women's volleyball players